The 1942 Wake Forest Demon Deacons football team was an American football team that represented Wake Forest University during the 1942 college football season. In its sixth season under head coach Peahead Walker, the team compiled a 6–2–1 record and finished in third place in the Southern Conference.

Back John Cochran and tackle Pat Preston were selected by the Associated Press as first-team players on the 1942 All-Southern Conference football team.

Schedule

References

Wake Forest
Wake Forest Demon Deacons football seasons
Wake Forest Demon Deacons football